The 2011 Zürich cantonal elections were held on 3 April 2011, to elect the seven members of the cantonal Executive Council and the 180 members of the Cantonal Council.

The Green Party gained a seat on the Executive Council but the FDP-SVP coalition retained a majority of four seats. In the Cantonal Council, the SVP retained a plurality but no alliance reached an overall majority.

Electoral system

Executive Council 
The Executive Council contains 7 members elected using a two-round majoritarian system. In the first round, electors have up to seven votes and the 7 most-voted candidates reaching an overall majority (>50%) are elected. If seats remain to be filled, a runoff is held where electors have as many votes as seats remaining, and the candidates with the most votes (simple plurality) are elected.

Cantonal Council 
The Cantonal Council is elected using open-list proportional representation, with canton-wide apportionment of seats and allocation into 18 constituencies (biproportional apportionment). In each constituency, voters have as many votes as there are seats to fill (panachage is permitted); these votes each count both for the candidate and for the list they stand in. These votes counts are divided by the seats count to give fictional electors counts which can be summed up fairly throughout the canton.

Using the fictional electors counts, each party above the threshold (reaching 5% in at least one constituency) is apportioned seats canton-wide, which are then shared among their constituency lists. In each constituency list, the seats are attributed to the candidates reaching the most votes.

Candidates

Executive Council 
Six of the seven incumbent councillors Ursula Gut (FDP), Hans Hollenstein (CVP), Thomas Heiniger (FDP), Regine Aeppli (SP), Markus Kägi (SVP), and Ernst Stocker (SVP, elected in a by-election in 2009) ran for re-election.

Incumbent Social Democratic executive councillor Markus Notter retired, with national councillor Mario Fehr running to hold the open seat.

The Greens fielded again Illnau-Effretikon mayor Martin Graf, who had reached an overall majority four years earlier but had failed to reach the top seven candidates needed to be elected. The EVP ran with national councillor Maja Ingold, while the Green-Liberals did not run any candidate for the executive council.

Cantonal Council 
The table below lists contesting parties represented in the Cantonal Council before the election.

The Swiss Democrats also ran after having lost their seats in 2007. Three new parties contested this election: the Conservative Democratic Party (BDP, who seceded from the SVP in 2008), the European Reform Party (ERP), and the Pirate Party (PP), meaning a total of 13 parties ran in this election.

Results

Executive Council 
Note: percentages here are calculated based on the amount of valid votes (excluding blank and invalid votes) so that the absolute majority is at exactly 50%, but may result in candidates reaching over 100% of the valid votes.

The results were a major upset and surprise as CVP candidate Hans Hollenstein fall from second to eighth, losing his seat to Green candidate Martin Graf by only two thousand votes, despite the polls predicting Hollenstein would finish in the top 3 candidates.

New candidate Mario Fehr gained a seat (retaining 2 seats for the SP) and topped the polls with over 81% of the votes by gaining votes from the bourgeois camp voters. FDP candidates saw their scores decrease slightly while the SVP gained slightly in votes.

The elections saw a high amount of consensus, as all elected candidates were voted on at least 44% of the ballots; Hollenstein's defeat was partly attributed to strategical voting based on his second-highest score in the previous election as well as opinion polls, but also to his policies' lack of appeal to leftist voters.

Despite the Green gain from the CVP, the FDP and SVP retained their majority of four seats in the executive council.

Results by district

Cantonal Council 

The SVP won a plurality of votes and seats, coming first but losing two seats; no bloc or alliance won an overall majority.

There were few shifts between the three “blocs”, as the left-wing (SP, GP, and AL), centrist (EVP, GLP, FDP, CVP, and now BDP), and right-wing (SVP and EDU) each won a third of the votes and seats; there were larger swings within the centrist bloc as the FDP, CVP, and EVP lost support while the GLP and BDP made gains.

There was also an increased fragmentation of the council as the three largest parties all lost seats. Older parties tended to see their support dwindle or stagnate, while the largest gains went to the newer parties: the GLP nearly doubled their support while the BDP entered with six seats.

Results by constituency

References 

Cantonal elections in Zürich
2011 elections in Switzerland